First Comes Courage is a 1943 American war film, the final film directed by Dorothy Arzner, one of the few female directors in Hollywood at the time. The film was based on the 1943 novel Commandos by Elliott Arnold, adapted by George Sklar, with a screenplay by Melvin Levy and Lewis Meltzer.  It stars Merle Oberon and Brian Aherne.

Plot
Nicole Larsen (Merle Oberon) is a member of the Norwegian resistance in a small town, about to marry the Nazi commandant (Carl Esmond).  When his superiors begin to suspect her, the Allies land an assassin to kill him: her former lover, Capt. Allan Lowe (Brian Aherne).

Cast
 Merle Oberon as Nicole Larsen
 Brian Aherne as Capt. Allan Lowell
 Carl Esmond as Maj. Paul Dichter
 Isobel Elsom as Rose Lindstrom
 Fritz Leiber as Dr. Aanrud
 Erville Alderson as Soren
 Erik Rolf as Ole
 Reinhold Schünzel as Col. Kurt von Elser
 Byron Foulger as Shopkeeper (uncredited)
 Miles Mander as Col. Wallace (uncredited)

Production
First Comes Courage had the working title of "Attack by Night".  The film was originally to have been set in France, but was changed to Norway because of the public's interest at the time in the occupation of that country.

When director Dorothy Arzner had an attack of pleurisy, she was replaced by Charles Vidor.  The film would turn out to be Arzner's final film.

Some scenes were filmed on Vancouver Island, British Columbia, with military units providing extras for the scenes of the commando attack.

Oberon and Aherne had played the leads in Beloved Enemy in 1936, with David Niven in a large supporting role. By 1943, when this early film about commandos was produced, Niven (according to his memoir "The Moon' a Balloon") was an actual commando fighting in World War II.

References

External links
  
 

1943 films
American black-and-white films
Films shot in British Columbia
1943 war films
American World War II films
1940s English-language films
Columbia Pictures films
World War II films made in wartime
Films set in Norway
Films directed by Dorothy Arzner
American war films
Films scored by Ernst Toch
Films about Norwegian resistance movement
Films based on American novels